John Siguria (also given as John D'Siguria) (born 28 July 1965) is a Papua New Guinean middle-distance runner. He competed in the men's 800 metres at the 1988 Summer Olympics. Siguria also won gold at the 800m in the 1985 South Pacific Mini Games. He also competed at the 1990 Commonwealth Games in the 800m and 1500m events.

References

External links
 

1965 births
Living people
Athletes (track and field) at the 1988 Summer Olympics
Papua New Guinean male middle-distance runners
Olympic athletes of Papua New Guinea
Athletes (track and field) at the 1990 Commonwealth Games
Commonwealth Games competitors for Papua New Guinea
Place of birth missing (living people)